Jungwirth is a German surname. Notable people with the surname include:

Daniel Jungwirth (born 1982), German footballer 
Florian Jungwirth (born 1989), German footballer
Gerold Jungwirth (born 1947), Austrian judoka
Ken Jungwirth (born 1946), Australian rules footballer
Leonard D. Jungwirth (1903–1963 or 1964), American sculptor 
Manfred Jungwirth (1919–1999), Austrian opera singer
Stanislav Jungwirth (1930-1986), Czechoslovak middle-distance runner
Tomáš Jungwirth (1942–1998), Czech middle-distance runner
William John Jungwirth (1897-1981), Australian public servant

German-language surnames